Rock Island Township may refer to the following townships in the United States:

 Rock Island Township, Rock Island County, Illinois
 Rock Island Township, Williams County, North Dakota

See also 
 Rock Island County
 Rock Island (disambiguation)
 Rock Township (disambiguation)